A suicide bombing took place on June 11, 2003, on Egged bus line 14a at Davidka Square in the center of Jerusalem. 17 people were killed in the attack and over 100 people were injured.

Hamas claimed responsibility for the attack.

The attack
At about 17:30 pm on Wednesday, June 11, 2003, a Palestinian suicide bomber dressed as an Orthodox Jew, boarded  bus 14a at the Mahane Yehuda market bus stop on Jaffa Road. At Davidka Square, the bomber detonated his explosive device, which contained a large quantity of metal shrapnel designed to cause maximum casualties.

17 people were killed in the attack and more than 100 people were injured, including dozens of passersby.

The perpetrators 
Hamas claimed responsibility for the attack and stated that the attack was an act of vengeance for the Israeli assassination attempt on the senior Hamas leader Abdel Aziz al-Rantissi on Tuesday, June 10, 2003. Rantisi survived the assassination attempt during which Israeli helicopters fired missiles at his car.

Lawsuits were filed against Arab Bank, NatWest and Crédit Lyonnais for channeling money to Hamas.

Israeli retaliation 
Shortly after the bus attack, Israeli helicopters fired rockets at a moving car in Gaza that was carrying, among others, two senior Hamas members. All of the car's six passengers were killed.

Official reactions
Involved parties
: A spokesman for the Israeli prime minister Ariel Sharon stated that the suicide attack indicates that the Palestinians have done nothing to crack down on militants.

:
 Palestinian National Authority - Yasser Arafat condemned the attack and urged Arabs and Israelis alike to stop the violence.

 International
 – US President George Bush condemned the attack and urged all nations to cut off financial assistance to terrorists and "isolate those who hate so much that they are willing to kill."

External links 
 Jerusalem Bus Bomb Kills 17 as Strife Rises; Airstrikes in Gaza Kill 9 Palestinians; Bush Plan Is Tested  - published on The Washington Poston June 12, 2003

See also 
 List of terrorist incidents, 2003
 Terrorism in Israel

References

Hamas suicide bombings of buses
Terrorist incidents in Jerusalem
Mass murder in 2003
2003 in Jerusalem
June 2003 events in Asia
Terrorist incidents in Jerusalem in the 2000s